Young Petrella is a collection of 16 short stories about the British policeman Patrick Petrella by the British writer Michael Gilbert published in the United Kingdom by Hodder and Stoughton in 1987 and in the United States by Harper & Row the same year.  All of the stories except one had previously appeared in the British magazine Argosy. In addition to the stories themselves, there is an introduction by Gilbert written especially for this book. The first story in the book, "The Conspirators", concerns an 11-year old Petrella; the rest are about his early career as a policeman in London, first as a detective constable, then as a detective sergeant. An earlier collection of stories, Petrella at Q, had been published ten years before, in 1977, but consisted of stories about Petrella's later years on the force, when he was first a detective inspector and then a deputy chief inspector. As usual with Gilbert, in spite of his smooth, urbane style, some of the stories take an unexpectedly grim turn, "Lost Leader", in particular, which begins with a group of teen-aged boys playing Robin Hood and comes to a harsh conclusion. "Michael was an exceptionally fine storyteller, but he's hard to classify," said one of his British publishers after his death. "He's not a hard-boiled writer in the classic sense, but there is a hard edge to him, a feeling within his work that not all of society is rational, that virtue is not always rewarded.".

Stories in order

Introduction, page 7 — by Michael Gilbert
PROLOGUE
The Conspirators, page 11 — Petrella is 11 years old in this story
DETECTIVE CONSTABLE
Who Has Seen the Wind?, page 31
The Prophet and the Bird, page 38
Nothing Ever Happens on Highside, page 47
Cash in Hand, page 55
Source Seven, page 65 — Inspector Hazlerigg has a role
The Night the Cat Stayed Out, page 79
DETECTIVE SERGEANT
Breach of the Peace, page 93
Voyage into Illusion, page 103 — Inspector Hazlerigg has a role
The Oyster Catcher, page 116
Dangerous Structure, page 130
Death Watch, page 140
Lost Leader, page 150 — Wilfred Wetherall has a brief appearance
The Coulman Handicap, page 166
The Sark Lane Mission, page 184
Paris in Summer, page 207

Notes

External links

1987 short story collections
British short story collections
Detective fiction short story collections
Short story collections by Michael Gilbert
Hodder & Stoughton books